Hard Truck: Apocalypse, known in Europe as Ex Machina, is a vehicular combat post-apocalyptic science fiction video game developed by Russian game developer Targem Games. It is part of the Hard Truck series. It is a Privateer-like game based around vehicles instead of spaceships, set in a post-apocalyptic Europe. The player controls an armored truck and roams between settlements trading with locals, completing quests and fighting numerous enemies to upgrade his truck and acquire better weapons to progress through the main storyline.

Plot 

The story showcases the Earth of the future after a crash of an unidentified flying object which was afterwards named The Cataclysm. After the crash the known world was destroyed: the atmosphere becomes poisonous and kills animals, plants and humans alike. Due to the invention of a special mask by an unknown genius, people manage to survive. Due to The Cataclysm, government law and order has completely vanished. Survivors built new cities and settlements far from metropolises of old and returned to raising crops and trading. Others roamed and explored, scavenging ruins for valuables and crafting. Roving gangs blighted Earth, causing traders and settlers to create means of self-defense, making their unions and clans.

Ivan Go, the great explorer and discoverer, departs for another journey and leaved the responsibility of his child, the player and protagonist, to his friend Peter. This child grows up, and a time comes when he is old enough that Peter allows him to ride their truck alone. He takes it to a nearby city and to perform a small job.

During his journey, he meets a girl named Alice. He then faces the local gang, and refuses to pay money to them. When he returns home, he finds out that his village has been attacked, there is fire everywhere and no one has been left alive. Enraged, he seeks revenge. He initially suspects the local gang are to blame, but discovers that it in fact wasn't them. Believing the young girl Alice to have witnessed the events, he sets off on a journey to find her and learn more.

When he meets Alice, she tells him that she believes the attack to be the actions of a gang leader from an area named Argen. The player tracks down and defeats the leader, but discovers again that it wasn't him who had destroyed his village.

Later the player and Alice meet the Oracle, who helps them find that the attackers were the monsters from the Desert Of Death, who had lost control of their minds, and were mentally impaired.

The player thinks that it is no use to kill those people, going on to search for their father Ivan but learning that he is already dead. He discovers the source of the poisonous air in the environment, and he comes in contact with extraterrestrials who tell him that if he destroys it, all the survivors die. However, the aliens have found an alternative - a device that will slowly clear the poisonous air safely. The Oracle tries to stop him from doing so and warns him that he is being used to finish a plan to Terraform Earth and will destroy humanity regardless. Deciding the Oracle to be lying, the player fights the Oracle and destroys him. The player then finally installs the device and begins to clear the source of the poison.

Gameplay 
Gameplay revolves around destroying enemies to get loot, selling it, and getting upgrades for your truck or buying new vehicles. The game has four difficulties: Easy, Medium, Hard and Impossible. There are many viable options for weapons, gadgets, vehicle parts, etc. The more you upgrade your vehicle, the more expensive it gets, causing better and stronger enemies to spawn. Enemies will also damage you, so you will see yourself repairing your vehicle often. There is an alternate storyline for added play-throughs.

There are main quests (marked with orange), and side quests (marked with magenta), which you can get from NPCs in settlements to earn more cash. There is a trading system in the game, where the player can buy goods from one settlement and sell it to another, or loot enemies to get goods. Different settlements will have different prices for buying and selling.

Format 

The player embarks on a long journey to avenge his father. He earns coins by trading, selling loot and performing jobs for NPCs. He can buy various weapons and gadgets, and can buy better vehicles. He then uses these purchases to defend himself against attacks from raiders.

Reception 

The game received "generally unfavorable reviews" according to the review aggregation website Metacritic, receiving an average of 45 out of 100 over 11 critical reviews.

Add-ons

Hard Truck Apocalypse: Rise of the Clans (Ex Machina: meridian 113) 
Rise of the Clans is the official standalone expansion to Hard Truck Apocalypse, also developed by Targem Games. It takes place in a post-apocalyptic version of North America. The player controls a vagrant who is searching for the mythical city of Edmonton.

The game reuses a lot of material from Hard Truck Apocalypse; most of the vehicles, weapons, and enemies are the same. However, there are four brand new zones and a whole new storyline.

Crossout 
The universe of Hard Truck Apocalypse expanded with its spiritual heir, post-apocalyptic free-to-play MMO-action game Crossout, also developed by Targem Games in cooperation with Gaijin Entertainment.

Crossout is set in 2047 after a mysterious viral epidemic known as the 'Crossout' which has laid waste to most of the population on Earth. The road warriors that survived must now battle for precious resources using deadly vehicles crafted from millions of possible permutations (body shape, armor, weapons, support systems and cosmetic enhancements).

Crossout is available on PC via Steam, PlayStation 4 and Xbox One.

References

External links 
 
 Hard Truck Apocalypse: Rise of the Clans official website
 Steam game page
 

2005 video games
Post-apocalyptic video games
Trade simulation games
Truck racing video games
Vehicular combat games
Video games developed in Russia
Video games set in North America
Windows games
Windows-only games
CDV Software Entertainment games
Single-player video games
Targem Games games
Buka Entertainment games